The Greek ironclad Vasilissa Olga was purchased from Chile for the Royal Hellenic Navy in 1868. She was converted into a training ship in 1897 and scrapped in 1925.

Design and description
The ship displaced  and was fitted with a single steam engine that drove one propeller. For long-distance travel, Vasilissa Olga was fitted with three masts and was barque rigged. She carried  of coal.

The ironclad was armed with a pair of  guns and ten 70-pounders, all of which were Armstrong rifled muzzle-loading guns. Above the belt amidships was an armored citadel that was protected by  plates on all four sides.

Construction and service
Vasilissa Olga, named for Queen Olga of Greece, was originally ordered by Chile from the Austro-Hungarian shipbuilder Stabilimento Tecnico Triestino, but Greece took over the contract in December 1868. The ship was laid down in 1868, launched in 1869 and completed in 1871. She was rearmed in 1880 and was converted into a gunnery training ship in 1897. During this conversion, Vasilissa Olga was re-engined and her sailing rig was replaced by two military masts. She was scrapped in 1925.

Notes

References

 

Ironclad warships of the Hellenic Navy
Ships built in Trieste
1870 ships